Flower Companyz is a Japanese rock band from Nagoya, Aichi. The band has released 15 original studio albums and 6 compilation albums since their formation in 1989.  Their most recent album, Stayin' Alive, was released on January 21, 2015.

Members 
Keisuke Suzuki - vocals
Great Maekawa - bass guitar
Kennichi Takeyasu - lead guitar
Mr. Konishi - drums

Discography

Studio albums 
Frakan no Fake de Iko (1995)
Frakan no My Blue Heaven (1996)
Oretachi Hatachizoku (1996)
Mammoth Flower (1998)
Prunes & Custard (1999)
Ikari no Bongo (2000)
Hakitaku Naruhodo Aisaretai (2002)
Hatsunetsu no Otoko (2003)
Tokyo Tower (2003)
Setagaya Yoakemae (2004)
Nounai Hyakkei (2006)
Tmashii ni Yoroshiku (2008)
Chest! Chest! Chest! (2010)
Happy End (2012)
Stayin' Alive (2015)

External links 

Japanese rock music groups
Musical groups established in 1989
1989 establishments in Japan
Sony Music Entertainment Japan artists
Musical groups from Aichi Prefecture